Professor D. C. Reddy, is an Electronics and Bio Medical engineering professor was Vice Chancellor of Osmania University, Hyderabad, Andhra Pradesh, India. He was the 19th vice-chancellor, and served as vice-chancellor from 1999  to 2002;  he was preceded by Prof. V. Ramakistayya (1996-1999), and followed by Prof. J. Anantha Swamy (2002-2004)

References

Year of birth missing
Scholars from Hyderabad, India
Academic staff of Osmania University